John "Jan" Lakeman  (April 6, 1887 – November 7, 1956) was a mid-20th century labour rights activist, perennial election candidate and leader of the provincial Communist Party in Alberta, Canada.

Political career
Born in the Netherlands, he came to Canada in 1905, eventually finding work in Edmonton with the Canadian National Railway. He became active in his railway workers union, the One Big Union, the Canadian Labour Party and the Communist Party of Canada. He was the first leader of the Alberta Communist Party after its founding in 1921/1922.

Communists were accepted in the Labour Party in the early 1920s and Lakeman was elected president of the Edmonton association for the Canadian Labour Party Alberta branch. He ran as a CLP candidate in 1926.

After a visit to Moscow in 1929, he was expelled from his union and from the Labour Party and lost his job. He then led fights by unemployed for improved treatment.

Lakeman ran in numerous provincial and federal elections. He ran as a Communist in elections in the 1930s and during World War II after the CPC was renamed the Labor-Progressive Party.

References

External links

Independent candidates in Alberta provincial elections
Communist Party – Alberta candidates in Alberta provincial elections
Dominion Labor Party (Alberta) candidates in Alberta provincial elections
Labor-Progressive Party candidates in the 1945 Canadian federal election
Candidates in the 1930 Canadian federal election
Candidates in the 1926 Canadian federal election
1887 births
1956 deaths
One Big Union (Canada) members
Dutch emigrants to Canada